Bromley Little Theatre is a community theatre in Bromley in the London Borough of Bromley, England and is a member of the Little Theatre Guild of Great Britain and its president is the actor Michael York.

The theatre was established in 1938 on its present site which was converted from an old Victorian bakery. The theatre has over 1,000 members split into full and audience-only groups, all the staff, cast and crew are volunteers.

The theatre is a registered charity run by the board of Trustees and include a youth group. The theatre's repertory members present approximately 11 shows each year as well as a number of smaller productions which are performed in the open "Bar Area". Performances run for around eight nights, apart from Sunday evenings when the theatre stage is used to showcase local or touring bands, among other events.

Notable alumni
Fenella Fielding – Film actor
Windsor Davies – Television actor
Michael York – Film actor
Derek Jacobi – Theatre, Television, and Film Actor
Prunella Scales – Television actor
Jude Law – Film actor
Scott Clifton Lucy -Theatre, Television Actor and Presenter 
Sarah Hoare – Theatre, Television, and Film Actor
 Barbara Kirby – Theatre, Television, and Film Actor
Jeremy Brett
Eileen Atkins
June Brown

References

Amateur theatre companies in England
Amateur theatre companies in London
Community theatre
Theatres in the London Borough of Bromley
Little Theatre Guild of Great Britain